Alexander Mikhaylovich Sibiryakov ( in Irkutsk – 1933) was a Russian gold mine and factories owner and explorer of Siberia.

Biography 
Sibiryakov graduated from the Zurich polytechnic institute in Switzerland. Later in life, he financed the polar expeditions of Adolf Erik Nordenskiöld (see Vega Expedition) and A.V. Grigoriev. He also sponsored the publication of works on Siberia's history. In 1880, he made an attempt to enter the Yenisei estuary through the Kara Sea on a schooner. In 1884, Sibiryakov reached the Pechora estuary on the "Nordenskjöld" steamer and proceeded up the river. He then crossed the Urals using reindeers and reached Tobolsk by the Tobol River. Sibiryakov contributed significantly to Siberia's economic development.

Legacy
Sibiryakov Island, an island in the Kara Sea at the mouth of the Yenisei River, is named after him, as well as icebreakers A. Sibiryakov and Sibiryakov.

See also
 Otto Schmidt
 Captain Vladimir Voronin

References

Yurii Semenov. Siberia: Its Conquest and Development. (Translated from the German by J.R. Foster). Helicon Press, Baltimore, 1963.

Russian explorers
Explorers of Siberia
Explorers of the Arctic
Businesspeople from the Russian Empire
Kara Sea
1849 births
1933 deaths
Recipients of the Order of St. Vladimir, 3rd class
Commanders First Class of the Order of the Polar Star